Criocoris is a genus of plant bugs in the family Miridae. There are about 13 described species in Criocoris.

Species
These 13 species belong to the genus Criocoris:

 Criocoris contrastus Seidenstucker, 1970
 Criocoris crassicornis (Hahn, 1834)
 Criocoris longicornis Reuter, 1883
 Criocoris morio Reuter, 1894
 Criocoris nigricornis Reuter, 1894
 Criocoris nigripes Fieber, 1861
 Criocoris piceicornis Wagner, 1950
 Criocoris quadrimaculatus (Fallén, 1807)
 Criocoris saliens (Reuter, 1876) (salien plant bug)
 Criocoris sibiricus Kerzhner, 1984
 Criocoris sulcicornis (Kirschbaum, 1856)
 Criocoris tesquorum Kerzhner, 1984
 Criocoris variegatus Stichel, 1934

References

Further reading

 
 
 

Phylinae
Articles created by Qbugbot